Death in High Heels is a 1941 crime novel by the British author Christianna Brand. Her debut novel, it featured Inspector Charlesworth, a young detective with Scotland Yard, who is called in when a young woman is murdered at an upmarket dress shop in London's Bond Street.

The same year Brand published Heads You Lose her first novel featuring her best known detective Inspector Cockrill and she did not return to a solo sequel featuring Charlesworth until The Rose in Darkness in 1979. However Charlesworth did make appearances in the Cockrill novels Death of Jezebel (1948) and London Particular (1952).

Adaptation
In 1947 it was made into a film of the same title starring Don Stannard, Elsa Tee and Veronica Rose. It was produced as a second feature at Marylebone Studios and distributed by Exclusive Films.

References

Bibliography
 Goble, Alan. The Complete Index to Literary Sources in Film. Walter de Gruyter, 1999.
 Hoffman, Megan. Gender and Representation in British ‘Golden Age’ Crime Fiction. Springer, 2016.

1941 British novels
1941 debut novels
Novels by Christianna Brand
British crime novels
British novels adapted into films
Novels set in London
British detective novels
The Bodley Head books